Aronda is a village in the Sindhudurg district, Maharashtra state, India. Aronda is famous for coconut cashew nuts, mangoes, jack fruit, Kokum, and rice. Aronda is a port on the boundary of Goa and Maharashtra. Aronda is next to Terekhol River, and has many ancient temples such as the Shri Sateri Bhadrakali Shri Ravalnath and Kulkar temple.

The original name of the village Aronda was Aravande. It is taught that the name Aravande is derived from Aravind, which means lotus. There is one lake between the Shri Sateri, Bhadrakali, and Ravalnath temples called Devtale. Devtale and Temple was renovated & built by Bakshi family. The myth goes that all gods and goddesses are taking a bath in it. This lake is full of red lotuses, and as such, the name of village is Aravande.

History of Aronda

Aronda (Aravande) was set up by the Rege family (GSB) as per royal orders of King of Sawantwadi State after Adilshah destroyed villages. Naik family (Maratha) were made Gaonkar of Aronda.

The Aronda High School building is situated on a small hill at the entrance of the village. This building was built by Late Shri VamanDada Rege at the beginning of the 19th century funded by H.H. Khem Sawant Bhosale, also known as Bapusaheb Maharaj, then Rular of Sawantwadi Sansthan.

The Goa Liberation Movement had its first meeting in 1947 in Aronda, held by Dr. Ram Mohan Lohia at Ummal Maidhan. Dinna Kamat and Krishna DessaI were leading operation from Aronda against Portuguese. Also located in the village is a very old library named Mahatma Gandhi Valchan Mandir. It was established on 2 October 1948, and has many old and new books. This vachanalya is founded by Aronda Gamonnati Mandal, a social registered organization established in 1947, in Mumbai, by Gangadhar Rege and Anant Shantaram Rege as Secretary (a well-known social worker) and other 15 members in Girgaon, Mumbai for the welfare of residents of Aronda. This organization is still very active. The late Kashinath Gaitonde a well known freedom fighter was first librarian. Nowadays this library is registered as an independent trust. A grade status in Maharashtra state. They get financial grants from state government. Aronda situated at the south of Maharashtra on the Goa border. The Terekhol river (an inlet) is towards the south. Towards the north, there are small hills with lush vegetation including trees of various types including cashews, mangos, and jackfruits. Aronda was one of several minor ports of Maharashtra directly connected to the Arabian Sea in the mid 20th century. This was an important port, and goods from Mumbai and south India were transported through this port.

Famous Festival

Every year on Margashish Shuddha Chaturthi, there is famous Jatra Utsav of Shri Sateri Bhadrakali  Temple. Every year 10 May is celebrated as Vardapandin of this Temples.

Original residents of Aronda come from all over India on this day for taking the blessing of goddesses. Fireworks of this ustav is one of the well known in Sindhudurg District.

References

History of Sawantwadi state.

Villages in Sindhudurg district